Korman Stadium is a sports stadium located in Port Vila, Vanuatu. It is the national stadium and the home of the Vanuatu national football team. The stadium's capacity is 6,500. Korman stadium was named for one of Vanuatu's politicians, the head of the Vanuatu Republican Party, Maxime Carlot Korman. Amical FC are tenants of the stadium.

Football venues in Vanuatu
Athletics (track and field) venues in Vanuatu
Port Vila
National stadiums